Max Monroe: Loose Cannon is an American television drama series. It ran one season.

Created by Dean Hargrove and Joel Steiger, it ran on the CBS Television Network from January 5, 1990 to April 19, 1990.<ref>Terrace, Vincent. Encyclopedia of Television Shows, 1925 through 2007 (Jefferson, North Carolina: McFarland & Co., 2008), p.971.</ref> The show centered around a Los Angeles Police Department detective with unconventional methods, who always manages to "get his man". The theme song was performed by Yello.

 Cast of characters 
Detective Max Monroe--Shadoe Stevens
Detective Charlie Evers--Bruce A. Young
Captain Farraday--David Schramm
Loretta Evers--Arnetia Walker

 Episodes 

 Notes 

 Sources 
Terrace, Vincent. "Max Monroe" in Encyclopedia of Television Shows, 1925 through 2007''. Jefferson, North Carolina: McFarland & Co., 2008.

External links 

1990 American television series debuts
1990 American television series endings
Television shows set in Los Angeles
English-language television shows
CBS original programming
1990s American crime drama television series
Serial drama television series
Television shows filmed in Los Angeles
Television series by CBS Studios